Shrovetide, also known as the Pre-Lenten Season, is the Christian period of preparation before the beginning of the liturgical season of Lent.

Shrovetide starts on Septuagesima Sunday, includes Sexagesima Sunday, Quinquagesima Sunday (commonly called Shrove Sunday), as well as Shrove Monday, and culminates on Shrove Tuesday, also known as Mardi Gras.

Significance 
During the season of Shrovetide, it is customary for Christians to ponder what Lenten sacrifices they will make for Lent. Another hallmark of Shrovetide is the opportunity for a last round of merrymaking associated with Carnival and Fastelavn before the start of the somber Lenten season; the traditions of carrying Shrovetide rods and consuming Shrovetide buns after attending church are celebrated. 

On the final day of the season, Shrove Tuesday, many traditional Christians, such as Lutherans, Anglicans, Methodists and Roman Catholics, "make a special point of self-examination, of considering what wrongs they need to repent, and what amendments of life or areas of spiritual growth they especially need to ask God's help in dealing with." During Shrovetide, many churches place a basket in the narthex to collect the previous year's Holy Week palm branches that were blessed and distributed during the Palm Sunday liturgies. On Shrove Tuesday, churches burn these palms to make the ashes used during the services held on the very next day, Ash Wednesday.

Western Churches
In the Roman Rite (pre-1970 form, and today in the Ordinariate (Anglo-Catholic) Form and Extraordinary (Tridentine) Form), and in similar Lutheran and Anglican uses, a pre-Lenten season lasts from Septuagesima Sunday until Shrove Tuesday and has thus also been known as Shrovetide. The Extraordinary form of the Roman Rite that includes this special period of 17 days, refers to it as the season of Septuagesima. The Ordinariate Form uses the term Pre-Lent. 

The liturgy of the period is characterized by violet vestments (except on feasts), the omission of the Alleluia before the Gospel, and a more penitential mood. Fasting does not commence until the beginning of Lent on Ash Wednesday. 

The earliest the Pre-Lenten season can begin is January 18 and the latest it can end is March 9. It is absent in the Ordinary Form of the Roman Rite and more recent Anglican forms of all these traditions, but may be found in some Lutheran churches who use the One-Year Lectionary to organize the church year.

Candlemas, which can be considered to be the last Christmastime feast, on February 2, can fall in pre-Lent if Easter is early enough.

In Northern Germany, local tradition states that if "sausages and sauerkraut are eaten at Shrovetide, good luck will follow". On the last day of Shrovetide, in Bohemia, a man personifies "Shrovetide" in a procession of masqueraders and whoever is able to snatch straw from his hat and place it under a hen in the coming Spring is said to have eggs that surely will hatch.

Lutheran countries such as Denmark mark Shrove Sunday (Quinquagesima Sunday) as the peak of the Fastelavn. After attending the Mass on Shrove Sunday, congregants enjoy Shrovetide buns (fastelavnsboller), "round sweet buns that are covered with icing and filled with cream and/or jam." Children often dress up and collect money from people while singing. They practice a tradition of hitting a barrel, which represents fighting Satan. After doing this, children enjoy the sweets inside the barrel. Lutheran Christians in these nations carry Shrovetide rods (fastelavnsris), which "branches decorated with sweets, little presents, etc., that are used to decorate the home or give to children."

Eastern Churches

In the Eastern Orthodox Church and those Eastern Catholic Churches which follow the Byzantine Rite, the pre-Lenten season lasts three weeks. It begins on the Sunday of the Publican and the Pharisee and continues through the Sunday of Forgiveness, the day before the beginning of Great Lent. Since the liturgical day begins at sunset, and Great Lent begins on a Monday, the point at which Great Lent begins is at Vespers on the night of the Sunday of Forgiveness, with a "Ceremony of Mutual Forgiveness". In some monasteries, this ceremony is performed at Compline instead of Vespers. 

Thus begins the first day of the Great Fast, which is known as Clean Monday. The weeks of pre-Lent and Great Lent are anticipatory by nature. They begin on Monday and end on Sunday, each week being named for the theme of the upcoming Sunday. The hymns used during the Pre-Lenten and Lenten seasons are taken from a book called the Triodion.

The weeks of the Pre-Lenten Season break are:

Zacchaeus Sunday (Slavic tradition) is sometimes regarded as a pre-Lenten Sunday because of its place in the Slavic lectionary.  In that tradition, it is the eleventh Sunday before Pascha (Easter).  There are no hymns proper to this Sunday. Its only distinguishing feature is the reading of Luke 19:1-10, the Gospel concerning Zacchaeus. This lectionary reading is sometimes also appointed on the same Sunday in the Byzantine ("Greek") lectionary, as well.  The week following this Sunday is a normal, non-Lenten time, since it falls outside the Triodion.
The Publican and the Pharisee: Tenth Sunday before Pascha (70 days).  The week following this Sunday is a fast-free week, lest the faithful be tempted, like the Pharisee to boast about fasting.
The Prodigal Son: Ninth Sunday before Pascha (63 days).  The week following this Sunday is the last during which the laity may eat meat or meat products. The fasting rules for this week are the same as those for non-Lenten periods.
The Last Judgment or Meat-Fare Sunday (the last day meat may be eaten): Eighth Sunday before Pascha (56 days).  The week following this Sunday is called Cheese-Fare Week and is a fast-free week, with the exception that meat and meat products are forbidden.
Sunday of Forgiveness or Cheese-Fare Sunday: Seventh Sunday before Pascha (49 days).  This Sunday is the last day dairy products may be consumed. Throughout Great Lent, fish, wine, and olive oil will be allowed only on certain days.

References

Lent
Liturgical seasons

pl:Przedpoście